The 1975 San Diego State Aztecs football team represented San Diego State University during the 1975 NCAA Division I football season as a member of the Pacific Coast Athletic Association. This was the final season for San Diego State as a member of the PCAA. They won or shared the conference championship in five of their seven years of membership.

The team was led by head coach Claude Gilbert, in his third year, and played home games at San Diego Stadium in San Diego, California. They finished the season with a record of eight wins, three losses (8–3, 3–2 PCAA).

Schedule

Team players in the NFL
The following were selected in the 1976 NFL Draft.

Team awards

Notes

References

San Diego State
San Diego State Aztecs football seasons
San Diego State Aztecs football